Charles Dettie Aaron (8 May 1866 – 1951) was an American gastroenterologist from Detroit. He is most well known for the creation of Aaron's sign, an indicator of appendicitis.

Bibliography
Aaron, Charles Dettie. Diseases Of The Digestive Organs, first published 1915

References

1866 births
1951 deaths
Physicians from Detroit